Border Wars was a professional wrestling pay-per-view (PPV) event produced by Ring of Honor (ROH) that took place on May 12, 2012 at the Ted Reeve Arena in Toronto, Ontario, Canada.

Storylines
ROH Border Wars professional wrestling matches involving different wrestlers from pre-existing scripted feuds, plots, and storylines that played out on Ring of Honor's (ROH) television programs. Wrestlers portrayed villains or heroes as they followed a series of events that built tension and culminated in a wrestling match or series of matches.

Results

See also

Professional wrestling in Canada

References

External links
Official Border Wars page
Official Ring of Honor page

2012
Events in Toronto
Professional wrestling in Toronto
Ring of Honor pay-per-view events
May 2012 events in Canada
2012 Ring of Honor pay-per-view events
2012 in Toronto